"The Road Not Taken" is a 1915 poem by Robert Frost.

It can also refer to:

Literature
 "The Road Not Taken" (short story), a 1985 short story by Harry Turtledove

Music
 The Road Not Taken (album), a 1989 album by country music group Shenandoah
 "The Road Not Taken", a song from the album Scenes from the Southside by Bruce Hornsby
 "The Road Not Taken", an adaptation of Frost's poem from the album Leverage by Lyriel
 "The Road Not Taken", another adaptation of Frost's poem as the first of seven movements in Frostiana: Seven Country Songs, a choral suite composed in 1959 by Randall Thompson.

Television
 "The Road Not Taken" (Stargate SG-1), an episode of Stargate SG-1
 "The Road Not Taken" (Fringe), a 2008 episode of Fringe, season 1
 "The Road Not Taken", a 2019 episode of The Orville, season 2
 "The Road Not Taken", an episode of Highlander: The Series
 "The Road Not Taken", an episode of MacGyver, season 2

Video games
 Road Not Taken, a 2014 indie game developed by Spry Fox

See also
The Roads Not Taken, 2020 film
Roads Not Taken: Tales of Alternate History, 1998 short story collection
The Road Less Traveled (disambiguation)